Ferdinand "Ferd" Adolphus Dreher (February 23, 1913 – December 28, 1996) was an American football end who played one season with the Chicago Bears of the National Football League (NFL). He was drafted by the Chicago Bears in the twelfth round of the 1938 NFL Draft. He played college football at the University of Denver and attended Jonesboro High School in Jonesboro, Arkansas.

College career
Dreher lettered in football for the Denver Pioneers from 1936 to 1937, earning two first-team all-conference awards. He recorded a team-high 30 points in 1936 and a second-best 35 points in 1937. He played basketball for the Pioneers from 1937 to 1938, helping the 1937 team to a 14–6 record while earning All-Rocky Mountain Conference honorable mention honors and also garnering third-team All-Skyline Conference accolades in 1938. Dreher also participated in track and field, winning the conference championships in the discus and shot put in 1937 and 1938. He played baseball in 1937. He earned seven letters as a Pioneer, two each in football, basketball and track while also earning one in baseball. Dreher was named the University of Denver Athlete of the Decade for the 1930s in May 1966. He was inducted into the University of Denver Athletics Hall of Fame in 2003.

Professional career
Dreher was selected by the Chicago Bears of the NFL with the 110th (and final) pick in the 1938 NFL Draft. He played in three games for the Bears during the 1938 season, recording 69 yards and one touchdown on three receptions.

References

External links
Just Sports Stats

1913 births
1996 deaths
American football ends
American male discus throwers
American male shot putters
American men's basketball players
Chicago Bears players
Denver Pioneers baseball players
Denver Pioneers football players
Denver Pioneers men's basketball players
People from Arkansas
People from Craighead County, Arkansas
People from Jonesboro, Arkansas
Players of American football from Arkansas